Barbara Hannah was born in England. She is well known for her association with Carl Gustav Jung whom she joined in 1929 in Zurich and remained so until his death.

Biography
Hannah began analysis with Jung in 1929. She befriended Joseph L. Henderson the same year, and shared accommodation with him in Zurich. In late 1974, she accepted Marion Woodman into analysis stating, "You are a parson's daughter; I am a parson's daughter...Jung told me that only a parson's child can handle a parson's child.'

Hannah became a close friend of Swiss Jungian psychologist Marie-Louise von Franz, to whom she was introduced by Jung. He encouraged the younger von Franz to live with her, stating that "the real reason you should live together is that your chief interest will be analysis and analysts should not live alone."

Hannah wrote a biography of Jung entitled Jung, His Life and Work: A Biographical Memoir. She also practised as a psychotherapist and served as lecturer at the C.G. Jung Institute.

Major works
The Animus: The Spirit of Inner Truth in Women, Volume 1 
The Animus: The Spirit of Inner Truth in Women, Volume 2  
The Archetypal Symbolism of Animals 
Encounters with the Soul 
Jung, His Life and Work: A Biographical Memoir  
Striving Toward Wholeness

References

1891 births
1986 deaths
British psychologists
Jungian psychologists
20th-century British writers
20th-century British women writers
British biographers
20th-century psychologists
British emigrants to Switzerland